The Extra NG is a two-seat German aerobatic monoplane designed by Walter Extra and built by Extra Aerobatic Aircraft.

Design and development
The NG is a two-seat low wing cantilever monoplane of carbon fibre construction. It has a fixed landing gear with a tail wheel and an enclosed cockpit with two seats in tandem (pilot in the rear and a passenger in the front). It is powered by a Textron-Lycoming AEIO-580-B1A engine with either a three or four-bladed tractor propeller.

The aircraft was presented to the public on 22 July 2019 at AirVenture. It received an EASA Type Certificate on 11 October 2019.

Specification

References

2010s German sport aircraft
Aerobatic aircraft
Low-wing aircraft
Single-engined tractor aircraft
Conventional landing gear